Balfour Beatty plc is an international infrastructure group based in the United Kingdom with capabilities in construction services, support services and infrastructure investments. A constituent of the FTSE 250 Index, Balfour Beatty works across the UK, US and Hong Kong.

By turnover, Balfour Beatty was ranked in 2021 as the biggest construction contractor in the United Kingdom.

History

Early years
Balfour Beatty was formed in 1909, with a capital of £50,000. The two principals were George Balfour, a qualified mechanical and electrical engineer, and Andrew Beatty, an accountant. The two had met while working for the London branch of the New York engineers JG White & Company. Initially, the company concentrated on tramways, the first contract being to construct the Dunfermline and District Tramways that opened in November 1909 for Balfour Beatty's own subsidiary, the Fife Tramway Light and Power Company.

It subsequently acquired a portfolio of electric power and tramway companies including in Carlisle, Cheltenham, Leamington & Warwick, Llanelly, Luton, Mansfield, Nottinghamshire & Derby, Falkirk and Wemyss. Some later operated trolley and motor buses. Several bus companies were purchased or formed including Midland General, Percivals (Carlisle), Stratford Blue and Scottish General Omnibus.

The Scottish bus subsidiaries were sold in June 1930 to W Alexander & Sons, and the Scottish tramways in 1935 to Scottish Motor Traction, Cheltenham was sold in July 1939 to Red & White Services with the remaining operations transferred to the Tilling Group.

Balfour Beatty's general construction expertise was extended during First World War with, for example, the building of army camps.

George Balfour was elected to the House of Commons in 1918 and played a large part in the debates which established the National Grid. To service this new market, George Balfour, Andrew Beatty and others formed Power Securities to finance projects, and the two companies, with their common directors, worked closely together.  Balfour Beatty was heavily involved in the development of Scotland's hydro electric power, building dams, transmission lines and power stations.

Other work between the wars included the standardisation of the electricity supply in Derbyshire and Nottinghamshire, and the construction of tunnels and escalators for the London Underground. Extensive overseas work started in 1924 when Balfour Beatty took over the management of the East African Power & Lighting company; construction work included hydro electric schemes in the Dolomites, Malaya and India, power stations in Argentina and Uruguay, and the Kut Barrage on the Tigris in Iraq.

By the onset of the Second World War, control of the firm had changed: Andrew Beatty had died in 1934 and George Balfour died in 1941. Construction work was now dominated by the war effort, and notable projects included blocking the approaches to Scapa Flow and the building of six Mulberry harbour units.

Post World War II
Peacetime saw a resumption of Balfour Beatty's traditional work, with power stations and railway work dominating at home. Overseas, a construction company was bought in Canada in 1953, and other work included the Mto Mtwara harbour in Tanganyika (now Tanzania) and the Wadi Tharthar irrigation scheme in Iraq.

In 1969, Power Securities, which by then owned Balfour Beatty, was taken over by cable manufacturer BICC. Balfour Beatty moved away from its traditional area of expertise in 1986, when it formed Balfour Beatty Homes, building on a modest scale from its office in Nottingham. It also opened offices in Paisley and Leatherhead, and in 1987, it bought the Derbyshire firm of David M Adams to give it an annualised production rate of up to 700 houses.

Little more than a year before the housing market collapsed, through its parent BICC, Clarke Homes was bought. By the middle of the 1990s, sales were down to only five hundred a year, and although no financial figures were ever published, the housing operation was believed to have suffered heavy losses. Balfour Beatty Homes was renamed Clarke Homes and then sold to Westbury in 1995.

21st century
In May 2000, BICC, having sold its cable operations, renamed itself Balfour Beatty. It then commenced a series of acquisitions, primarily in the United Kingdom and North America; in 2004, it also acquired Skanska's 50% stake in Hong Kong's Gammon Construction. In 2011, Balfour Beatty sold its trackwork manufacturing business to Progress Rail.

Acquisitions in the United Kingdom

Balfour Beatty's acquisitions in the United Kingdom included: construction services business Mansell plc, for £42m in November 2003, construction and civils contractor Birse plc, for £32m in August 2006, Bristol construction company Cowlin Construction, also in October 2007, and regional contractor Dean & Dyball for £45 million in February 2008.

In November 2010, the company bought the remnant of collapsed construction company Rok plc for £7 million.

North American acquisitions
In February 2007, Balfour Beatty acquired Texas based Centex Construction for £180m. In February 2008, the company bought GMH Military Housing, a United States-based military accommodation business, for £180m.

In September 2009, the company agreed to buy Parsons Brinckerhoff, a project management firm based in the United States, for $626 million. Balfour Beatty sold Parsons Brinckerhoff to WSP Global for $1.24bn in October 2014. In October 2010, the company bought Halsall Group, a Canadian professional services firm, for £33 million.

In June 2011, it bought Howard S. Wright, one of the oldest contractors on the West Coast of the United States, for £58 million as well as Fru-Con Construction, a water and wastewater contractor based in the United States, for £12 million and in January 2013, it bought Subsurface Group, a consulting and engineering firm based in the United States.

Rebuffed merger
In August 2014, the company rebuffed three offers by its rival in the United Kingdom, Carillion, for the two companies to merge. The last bid, which valued Balfour Beatty at £2.1 billion, was unanimously rejected by the Balfour Beatty board on 20 August 2014, one day before a deadline for negotiations to conclude. Balfour refused to allow an extension of time for negotiations which could have prompted a fourth bid. Carillion subsequently announced it would no longer pursue a merger with its rival.

In May 2021, it was announced that Lord Allen would be the next Balfour Beatty chairman, succeeding Philip Aiken from 20 July 2021.

Controversies

Hatfield rail crash

In October 2005, Balfour Beatty was found guilty of breaching health and safety laws, and were fined £10 million for its involvement in the October 2000 Hatfield rail crash. The crash resulted in the death of four people, and injured more than 70.

Blacklisting

In March 2009, the company was found to be a subscriber to the Consulting Association, a firm which was then prosecuted by the UK Information Commissioner's Office for breaching the Data Protection Act by holding a secret database of construction workers details, including union membership and political affiliations, and six enforcement notices were issued against Balfour Beatty companies.

In January 2010, individual workers had started suing the company for being on the blacklist; the first of these cases, however, was ruled in favour of the company.

On 10 October 2013, Balfour Beatty was one of eight construction firms involved in blacklisting that apologised for their actions, and agreed to pay compensation to affected workers. The eight businesses established the Construction Workers Compensation Scheme in July 2014, though the scheme was condemned as a "PR stunt" by the GMB union, and as "an act of bad faith" by Parliament's Scottish Affairs Select Committee.

A High Court case regarding the blacklisting was scheduled for May 2016. In October 2015, during preliminary stages of the case, the eight firms did not accept the loss of earnings that the blacklisting victims had suffered, but, in January 2016, they increased their compensation offers.

On 22 January 2016, the High Court ordered 30 construction firms to disclose all emails and correspondence relating to blacklisting by 12 February 2016, after it emerged that Balfour Beatty managers had referred to blacklisted workers as ‘sheep’. However, some settlements were eventually agreed, and on 11 May 2016, a 'formal apology' from the 40 firms involved was read out in court and the case (Various Claimants v McAlpine & Ors) was closed.

In December 2017, Unite announced it had issued high court proceedings relating to blacklisting against twelve major contractors, including Balfour Beatty.

Late payment
In April 2019, Balfour Beatty was suspended from the UK Government's Prompt Payment Code, for failing to pay suppliers on time. It was reinstated around 10 months later.

Military housing fraud 
In December 2021, Balfour Beatty Communities LLC, one of the largest providers of privatized military housing to the U.S. Armed Forces, pleaded guilty to one count of major fraud against the United States. The company was sentenced to pay over $33.6 million in criminal fines and over $31.8 million in restitution to the U.S. military, serve three years probation, and engage an independent compliance monitor for three years.  The company lied about repairs made to housing for U.S. servicemembers and pocketed performance bonuses to which it was not entitled.

Operations

Balfour Beatty is an international infrastructure group. They finance, develop, build and maintain the vital infrastructure that we all depend on. Its capabilities include:
Construction services: Civil engineering, building, ground engineering, M&E, refurbishment, fit-out and rail engineering
Support services: electricity networks, rail and highways
Infrastructure investments: A portfolio of long term (public–private partnership, 'PPP') concessions in the United Kingdom, primarily in the education, health and roads/street lighting sectors, plus a portfolio of long term military and multi-family housing, and student accommodation assets in the United States. Balfour Beatty also has interests in non PPP assets in the United Kingdom.
Balfour Beatty is a member of a wide range of industry and trade bodies, associations and institutions, reflecting the significant breadth of its capability as well as corporate priorities. These include, for example, the CBI, CECA, the Nuclear Industry Association, the Rail Industry Association and Women into Construction.

Notable projects

Projects involving Balfour Beatty include:

 The Kut Barrage, Iraq, completed in 1939
 The Churchill Barriers, Orkney, completed in 1940-44
The Kielder Dam, Northumberland, completed in 1982
The Docklands Light Railway in London, completed in 1985
Large parts of the M25 motorway around London, completed in 1986
Sheffield Supertram, completed in 1994
The Channel Tunnel, completed in 1994
The Cardiff Bay Barrage, completed in 1999
The University Hospital of North Durham, completed in 2001
The Lesotho Highlands Water Project, completed in 2002
Nam Cheong station, Hong Kong, completed in 2003
The Pergau Dam hydroelectric project in Malaysia, completed in 2003
The M6 Toll, completed in 2003
New facilities for the Royal Infirmary of Edinburgh, completed in 2003
University College London Hospital, completed in 2005
Igor I. Sikorsky Memorial Bridge, Connecticut, USA, completed in 2006
Royal Blackburn Teaching Hospital, completed in 2006
Dubai Mall, completed in 2008
The United States Capitol Visitor Center, completed in 2008
The King's Cross St Pancras tube station Northern Ticket Hall, completed in 2009
Tameside General Hospital, completed in 2009
Redevelopment of Stobhill Hospital in Glasgow, completed in 2009
The Caernarfon Criminal Justice Centre, completed in 2009
Queen Elizabeth Hospital Birmingham near Selly Oak, Birmingham, completed in 2010
Pinderfields Hospital in Wakefield, completed in 2010
Pontefract Hospital, completed in 2010
The East London line, completed in 2010
The A3 Hindhead Tunnel, completed in 2011
The London Aquatics Centre, completed in 2011
The M25 motorway widening J16 to 23 and J27 to 30, completed in 2012
Extension to the Victoria Hospital in Kirkcaldy, completed in 2012
The Blackfriars station and Bridge Construction Works, completed in 2012
The rebuilding of Salford Royal Hospital, completed in 2012
The new main facility for Parkland Memorial Hospital in Dallas, Texas, completed in 2014
 The M4/M5 Managed Motorways project in Bristol, completed in 2014
Providence Tower, London, completed in 2015
British Columbia Women's and Children's Hospital Acute Care Centre, Vancouver, Canada, completed in 2017
Aberdeen Western Peripheral Route, completed in 2019
Crossrail Liverpool Street station and Whitechapel station tunnels project, completed in 2020
Green Line Extension, in Cambridge, Somerville, and Medford, Massachusetts, completed in 2021
the expansion of Whitechapel station for Crossrail completed in 2021
 The Viking Power Link between Denmark and the UK, due to complete in 2023
LAX Automated People Mover in the US due to complete in 2023 
Western section of Thames Tideway Scheme in London, due to complete in 2025
Central Kowloon Route in Hong Kong due to complete in 2025
Hinkley Point C nuclear power station, Somerset due to complete in 2027
Old Oak Common Station due to complete in 2030
HS2 lots N1 and N2, working as part of joint venture, due to complete in 2031

References

External links

 
 Yahoo Finance profile

British companies established in 1909
Technology companies established in 1909
Construction and civil engineering companies of England
Construction and civil engineering companies established in 1909
Companies based in the London Borough of Tower Hamlets
Companies listed on the London Stock Exchange
Streetworks
Health care companies of England
1909 establishments in England